Minuscule 798 (in the Gregory-Aland numbering) ε 473 (Soden). It is a Greek minuscule manuscript of the New Testament, on 260 parchment leaves (17 cm by 11.5 cm). It is dated palaeographically to the 11th century.

Description 

The codex contains the text of the Gospels with some lacunae (Mark 1:-8:2). The text is written in one column per page, 20 lines per page in minuscule letters. The initial letters in red. Size of the text is 11.4 by 7.5 cm. Mark 1:1-8:2 is faded.

There is also a division according to the smaller Ammonian Sections, with references to the Eusebian Canons.

It contains lectionary markings at the margin and pictures.

Text 

The Greek text of the codex is a representative of the Byzantine text-type. Aland placed it in Category V.

It was not examined by using Claremont Profile Method.

History 

The codex was divided into two parts and now located in two places. Matthew and Mark on 112 folios are housed in Εθνική Βιβλιοθήκη (137), in Athens. Luke and John on 148 folios are housed in Bibelmuseum (Ms. 7) in Münster.

Gregory saw the manuscript in 1886.

See also 
 List of New Testament minuscules
 Textual criticism

References

Further reading

External links 

 Images of Minuscule 798 at the CSNTM
 Manuscripts of the Bible Museum

Greek New Testament minuscules
11th-century biblical manuscripts
Manuscripts of the National Library of Greece